Charali is a neighbourhood in Birtamod, Jhapa in Nepal. The place lies at the intersection of East-West highway and Mechi Highway that traverses from South to North. It serves as a major entry point for the eastern hills of Nepal.

References

Populated places in Jhapa District